Deer Hunter, also known as Deer Hunter: Interactive Hunting Experience, is a 1997 video game developed by Sunstorm Interactive and published by WizardWorks.

Development
The game was developed by a five-member team in three months with a budget of $125,000. The game had two add-packs, Deer Hunter Extended Season and Deer Hunter Companion.

Reception

Computer Games Magazine gave the game a score of 2 out of 5 stating "Deer Hunter takes some good first steps, but it has a long way to go to make a good computer game."

The game sold 500,000 copies by March 1998 and over 1 million by October 1998. In early 1998 it appeared in the top 10 of PC Datas best-seller list.

References

1997 video games
Classic Mac OS games
Game Boy Color games
Hunting video games
Video games developed in the United States
WizardWorks games
Windows games